Krass is a surname. Notable people with the surname include:

 Caroline D. Krass (born 1968), American attorney and government official
 Johannes Krass (1891–1989), Estonian politician
 Julia Krass (born 1997), American skier

See also
 Kraš (surname)